Yiangoudakis is a surname. Notable people with the surname include:

Rafael Yiangoudakis (born 1990), Cypriot footballer
Yiannakis Yiangoudakis (born 1959), Cypriot footballer